This is a List of notable Old Boys of The Scots College, they being notable former students - known as "Old Boys" of the Presbyterian Church school, The Scots College in Bellevue Hill, New South Wales, Australia.

Academic 
 John Burrows, an emeritus professor at the University of Newcastle; also a recipient of the Centenary Medal 2001
 John Chudleigh, an emeritus professor and consultant in agriculture; also a recipient of the Centenary Medal 2001
 John Longworth, an agricultural consultant and former executive at Shafston College; a Professor at the University of Queensland
 Stuart Meade, the headmaster of Hale School, Western Australia
 Graham Nicholson, a professor of neurotoxicology at University of Technology, Sydney
 John Piggott, a professor of economics at the University of New South Wales
 Tony Rae , a former chairman of the Headmasters' Conference of the Independent Schools of Australia
 Peter van Onselen, a professor of politics and journalism at the University of Western Australia
Brenden D Tempest-Mogg, president, Warnborough College, UK, President, Warnborough Foundation, UK
Daryl V Tempest-Mogg, CEO, Academy for Distant Learning, UK, Online Short Courses

Rhodes scholars 
 1928 - Richard Ashburner - BA University of Sydney
 1929 - Ian Edwards - BA University of Sydney
 1946 - Lloyd Stuart Williams - BEng University of Sydney
 1980 - Philip John Crowe - MB BS University of Sydney

Business 
 James Bain, a company director, farmer, author; Chairman of NatWest Aust. Bank Ltd (1985–91), W. Bain & Co. (1947–87); Sydney Stock Exchange Ltd (1983–87) (also attended The Armidale School)
 Antony Coote , a former Executive Chairman of Angus & Coote (1999–2007); and a former director of ING Bank (Aust)
 Patrick Elliott, a company director with interests in mining
 Jim Fleming , the former Chairman and Managing Director of Jewel Food Stores Pty Ltd, Director of Davids Ltd, Assistant Director of Woolworths, Director of Flemings Food Stores
 Tony Fountain, a co-founder of Combined Rural Traders Ltd; a pioneer in computer-oriented livestock marketing; and a former national president of the Australian Democrats
 Lee Freedman, a racehorse trainer with 120 career Group one wins including five Melbourne Cups, four Golden Slippers, four Caulfield Cups, four VRC Oaks, four Australasian Oaks, five Lightning Stakes, two Cox Plates, one AJC Oaks
 Clay Frederick, a former Chief Executive Officer, Adsteam Marine Limited; and former director of Sydney Ferries 
 Ian Harper , a company director and solicitor (also attended Scotch College Melbourne)
 Ted Harris , a company director, tennis commentator and sport administrator
 Charles Kiefel AM, board director of the GFCC and Co-Chair of the Australian Advisory Board of Healthcare and Technology Competitiveness
 John Maxwell, a Royal Australian Air Force Flight Lieutenant seconded to Royal Air Force, and later Chairman of Aetna Life
 Sir Roderick Miller, a company director of R. W. Miller (Holdings) Ltd
 Graham Nock , a company director
 Ezra Norton, a former newspaper proprietor (also attended Waverley College)
 Tom Parry , an economist and public servant
 Brian Primrose, the managing director of Primrose Solutions Pty Ltd and a gold medallist for Sailing in the Australian Masters Games (2003)
 Robert Somervaille , a legal and telecommunications technology consultant and company director; awarded the Légion d'honneur (also attended Scotch College Melbourne)
 Harry Triguboff , a property developer and billionaire owner of Meriton Apartments
 John Winning, the founder and chief executive of Winning Appliances and Appliances Online

Clergy 
 Victor Clark-Duff, a Presbyterian clergyman
 Dr. Peter Jensen, the current Anglican Archbishop of Sydney
 Rt. Rev. Ian Shevill, an Anglican Bishop

Community 
 Ian Kiernan , an environmentalist who founded Clean Up Australia, and Clean Up The World (also attended The Armidale School)

Media, entertainment and the arts 
 Ian Bevan, a journalist, war correspondent, author, and theatrical producer
 Conway Bown, war artist and Army helicopter pilot
 Luke Bracey, an actor, best known for his roles in The November Man and in The Best of Me.
 Colin Cameron, a commercial radio entrepreneur
Ben English, editor The Daily Telegraph, Sydney
 Kenneth MacQueen, an artist
 William Mansell, an artist and designer (also attended Sydney Grammar School)
 Callan McAuliffe, an actor, best known for his roles in the romantic comedy drama film Flipped and in the teen action science fiction film I Am Number Four.
 Roger McDonald, a poet and writer
 Scott McGregor, an actor and presenter on the Seven Network's Better Homes and Gardens
 Sam Parsonson, an actor
 Anthony Peridis, a co-host of The World Game on SBS
 Mark Renengi, an editor for FHM
 Alex Simpson, a style editor and online editor for GQ Australia
 Peter van Onselen, a political commentator and biographer
 Tim Webster, a newsreader and sports presenter
 Peter Weir , a film director (The Truman Show, The Cars That Ate Paris, Dead Poets Society)
 Brett Whiteley, an artist (also attended The Scots School, Bathurst) Whiteley hated attending The Scots College, Sydney, and was ultimately expelled for stealing from the newsagency in Double Bay.
 Rusty Young, an author
 Hiroaki Yura, a violin virtuoso, founder and concertmaster of the Eminence Symphony Orchestra

Medicine and science 
 Robert Allan, a physician and obstetrician (also attended Brisbane Grammar School)
 Anthony Baker, a chemist and research scientist at the CSIRO
 George Bell, a prominent surgeon
 John Berryman, a chief executive of the Royal Institute for Deaf and Blind Children
 Andrew Child , an obstetrician and gynaecologist
 Graeme Clark , a pioneer of the multiple-channel cochlear implant (also attended Sydney Boys High School)
 Richard Day , a clinical pharmacologist
 Alan Donald , a scientific consultant and Director of the CSIRO Institute for Animal Production and Processing
 Kay Ellem , a professor at the Queensland Institute of Medical Research
 Peter Elliott , an obstetrician and gynaecologist
 John Ham, a surgeon
 Peter Hendry , a pathologist and former Deputy Chancellor at the University of Newcastle
 John Lane , an aeromedical monitor for the United States manned space flight program in the Mercury and Gemini space programs; and a medical officer in the Royal Australian Air Force
 Gerald Lawrie, an American heart surgeon and pioneer in the surgical treatment of valvular heart disease
 Dr Martin Mendelson - Head Prefect 1976 - deregistered by medical tribunal for a period of at least two years in December 2008 - professional misconduct, when he engaged in oral sexual intercourse with a female patient during a consultation in his room after-hours
 John Norman , an oral and maxillofacial surgeon (also attended Hale School)
 Frank Radcliff, a biochemist
 George Repin , a health services educator
 Dr Charlie Teo , a neurosurgeon and founder of the Cure Brain Cancer Foundation

Military 
 Arthur Aspinall, together with Archibald John, Andrew Eric and William Robert Aspinall
 Major-General Donald Begg, Head of Logistic Command 
 Arnold Brown , an Australian Army officer; decorated for services in Cyrenaica
 Cooper Dale, an Australian Army officer awarded the Bronze Star for pioneering Afghan Tactical Air Coordinator capability within the ANA
 Rear Admiral Sir David James Martin , a former senior officer of the Royal Australian Navy
 Vice Admiral Sir Alan McNicoll , a senior officer in the Royal Australian Navy and a diplomat
 Major-General Ronald McNicoll 
 Colonel Rowan Tink , a former Australian Army Special Air Service Regiment commander, awarded the US Bronze Star following active duty in Afghanistan
 Commander Mark Todd, a former commanding officer of HMAS Kuttabul and former strategic planner for United States Central Command

Politics, public service and the law

Judiciary
 Murray Herbert Tobias AM RFD KC, Judge the NSW Court of Appeal (2003-2016), President of the NSW Bar Association (1993-1995), Captain and Judge Advocate of the Royal Australian Navy
 Graham Armitage , an acting Judge of the District Court of New South Wales and retired Judge of the District Court of New South Wales (1989–2006); a former Crown Prosecutor (1975–86)
 John Ellis , a former Senior Judge of the Family Court of Australia
 David Landa, a legal consultant and former Chief Magistrate of New South Wales
 Robert McDougall, a Justice of the Supreme Court of New South Wales
 Murray Wilcox AO QC, Judge of the Federal Court of Australia (1984-2006), Judge of the ACT Supreme Court (1983-2006), Chief Justice of the Industrial Relations Court of Australia (1994-2006).

Politics
 Alexander Armstrong, a pastoralist and Member of the New South Wales Legislative Council representing the Liberal Party of Australia (1953–69)
 Richard Bull, a former Member of the New South Wales Legislative Council representing the National Party of Australia (1984–2000)
 Joseph Calcraft , a Member of the New South Wales Legislative Council; Councillor at Shoalhaven Council (1962–65)
 Peter Dowding , a barrister and former Premier of Western Australia (also attended Caulfield Grammar School and Hale School)
 David Drummond, a former Member of the New South Wales Legislative Assembly and the Australian House of Representatives representing the Country Party
 Ralph Hunt , a former Member of the House of Representatives for Gwydir (1969–89) representing the National Party of Australia
 John Jobling , a former member of the New South Wales Legislative Council representing the Liberal Party of Australia and local councillor
 Wal Murray, a former Deputy Premier of New South Wales and Leader of the NSW National Party
Andrew Hastie, a Liberal Party member of the Australian House of Representatives, representing the division of Canning since 2015. Prior to politics, he was a troop commander in the Special Air Service Regiment.

Public service
 David Bennett , a Solicitor-General of Australia; barrister; Queen's Counsel of all States (also attended Hall School, Hampstead)
 John Cunningham, a Consul General of Barbados for New South Wales, the Australian Capital Territory and Queensland

Other notable lawyers
 Stuart Littlemore , a barrister and former host of the ABC TV's Media Watch
 Alan Loxton , (1934) a former senior partner Allen, Allen and Hemsley

Sport

Rugby

Wallabies
 Twins Jim Boyce and Stewart Boyce - Wallabies (1962)
 David Brockhoff - Wallaby player (1949–53) and coach of the Wallabies and Waratahs
 Hugh (Murray) Buntine - Wallaby(1924)
 Bill Calcraft - Wallaby (1985)
 David Carter - Wallaby (1988)
 Sam Carter - Wallaby (2014)
 Ken Catchpole - Wallaby, 27 Tests (1961–68) and captain in 13 match
 Philip John Crowe - Wallaby (1976)
 Max Elliott - Wallaby (1985)
Tim Gavin - Wallaby (1988–96)
 Daryl Haberecht - Wallaby coach (1978)
 Phil Hardcastle - Wallaby, 5 Tests (1946–49) and captain in 1 match
 Jim Hindmarsh - Wallaby (1975–76)
 William (Bill) McKid - Wallaby (1976-79)
 Rupert Rosenblum - Wallaby (1969–70)
 John Solomon - Wallaby, 14 Tests (1949–55) and captain in 8 matches
 Warwick Waugh - Wallaby (1993–97)
 Tom Bowman - Player who plays lock (2nd row). He has so far won 16 caps for Australia, making his debut in the 76-0 thrashing England in June 1998. The last test he played for Australia was the World Cup pool match against the U.S. in 1999.

State/Provincial
 Stuart Pinkerton - Waratah (2001)
 Richard Stanford - Rugby union player for the ACT Brumbies
 Henari Veratau - Rugby union player for the Queensland Reds and ACT Brumbies
 David Horwitz - Waratah (2016)
 Andrew Kellaway - Waratah (2016)

Other sports

 Hugh Bowman, a jockey; recipient of the Silver Saddle Award for most successful jockey (Royal Ascot)
 Don Bursill, Australian Athletics 1958-59 T&F  Champion 20.9s and held the Scots C, sprints; Commonwealth junior record
 Forbes Carlile , Australia's first post-World War II Olympics swimming coach; Australia's first competitor in the modern pentathlon (1956 Summer Olympics); Only person to have coached and later competed at the Olympic Games
 Alan Crompton , Australian cricketer, former Chairman of the Australian Cricket Board
 Clay Frederick, Australian [rifle shooting (small-bore)] representative World Championships 1974, 1978. Australian Champion 1980. Multiple State Champion (NSW, QLD, VIC). President Target Rifle Australia
 Chris Ogle, Australian Rules Footballer for the Western Bulldogs. First recipient of a NSW AFL scholarship
Andrew Ratcliffe, Commonwealth Games gold medal winning sprinter.
 Colin Scotts, former NFL Defensive End; Played for the St. Louis Rams/Cardinals
Murray Stewart, Australia kayaker and Olympic Gold medallist at the 2012 Summer Games in London (Men's K-4 1000 metres)
 Thomas Whalan, four-time water polo Olympian (Sydney 2000, Athens 2004, Beijing 2008, and London 2012)

See also
 List of non-government schools in New South Wales
 List of boarding schools
 Athletic Association of the Great Public Schools of New South Wales

References

Bibliography
 Howell, Max (2005) Born to Lead - Wallaby Test Captains, Celebrity Books, Auckland NZ

External links
 The Scots College
 Old Boys Union

Scots College
Presbyterian schools in Australia
University of Western Sydney|Old Boys of the Scots College
Lists of Australian men